The Metro Bowl has traditionally been the championship game for Secondary School football teams in the Greater Toronto Area, Canada, from 1982 until 2012. The game was revived by the Ontario Federation of School Athletic Associations beginning in 2015 as one of a series of nine regionally themed bowl games held as part of an annual Ontario football bowl game festival since 2015. Rather than a strictly Toronto-area championship, the Metro Bowl is now held between one of either the Toronto District College Athletic Association (TDCAA) representing Catholic schools or the Toronto District Secondary School Athletic Association (TDSSAA) representing public schools, alternating each year, against another Ontario association's champion determined by draw. The Toronto association not playing in the Metro Bowl in a particular year will instead play in one of the other bowl games.

The game has been held annually during the later part of November or early December at a venue in or in close proximity to the City of Toronto.

Schools with multiple titles are: St. Michael's College School, Toronto (7); Richview Collegiate Institute, Toronto (3); Central Technical School, Toronto 2; Nelson High School, Burlington (4); Northern Secondary School (Toronto) (2); St. Patrick's Catholic High School, Sarnia (2) Woburn Collegiate Institute, Toronto (2)

Results

2016 
CHAMPION: St. Matthew High School

Michael Power/St. Joseph High School (7) – St. Matthew High School (28)

Championship (TDCAA vs NCSSAA)

(TDSSAA champion to play in Northern Bowl)

2015 
Championship (TDSSAA vs CWOSSA):

Resurrection Catholic Secondary School Phoenix (CWOSSA) 31, Etobicoke Collegiate Institute Rams (TDSSAA) 8, played December 2nd.

(TDCAA champion played in the Western Bowl)

2012

2011

2010

2009

2008

2007

2006 

Note: Following their conference victory, St. Michaels had to play a quarter-final game against the Simcoe County champions with the winner advancing to the semi-finals.  St. Michaels College won this game 40-32 over the Bear Creek Kodiaks.

2005

2004 
 Championship: St. Michael's College 22, Pickering H. S. 15

Semi-finals: St. Michael's College 41, Richmond Hill H. S. (Richmond Hill) 21Pickering H. S. 18, Northern S. S. 10

2003 
Championship: Cedarbrae C. I. 25, Northern S. S. 21

Semi-finals:Cedarbrae C. I. 31, Richview C. I. 14Northern S. S. 23, St. Michael's College School 9

2002 
Championship: St. Michael's College 42, Etobicoke C.I. 6

Semi-finals: St. Michael's College 27, Central Technical School 0Etobicoke C.I. 29, Richview C. I. 15

2001 
Championship: Richview C. I. 37, Central Technical 0

Semi-finals: Richview C. I. 11, Northern S. S. 3Central Technical 40, Birchmount Park C. I. (Toronto) 21

2000 
Championship:Lorne Park S. S. 11, Notre Dame C. S. S. (Burlington) 0

Semi-finals:Lorne Park S. S. 28, St. Michael's College 21Notre Dame C. S. S. (Burlington) 21, St. Mary C. S. S. 0

1999 
Championship: Nelson H. S. 22, Central Technical 20

Semi-finals:Nelson H. S. 59, St. Mary C. S. S. (Pickering) 8Central Technical 26, St. Michael's College School 13

Quarter-finals:Central Technical 7, West Hill C. I. 0St. Michael's College School 37, Richview C. I. 14Nelson H. S. 43, St. Andrew's College 32 (Overtime)St. Mary C. S. S. 42, Barton S. S. (Hamilton) 23

1998 
Championship: St. Michael's College 43, Agincourt C. I. (Toronto) 6

Semi-finals: 
St. Michael's College 23, St. Andrew's College (Aurora) 11Agincourt C. I. 27, Glendale S. S. (Hamilton) 22

1997 
Championship: Nelson H. S. (Burlington) 14, Cedarbrae C. I. (Toronto) 7

Semi-finals: Nelson H. S. 31, Central Technical School 0Cedarbrae C. I. 28, Michael Power/St. Joseph H.S. 6

Quarter-finals: Cedarbrae C. I. 28, Henry Street H. S. 21Michael Power/St. Joseph H.S. 14, St. Michael's College 7Central Technical School 12, Northern S. S. 0Nelson H. S. 28, Loyola C. S. S. (Mississauga) 0

1996 
Championship:Clarkson S. S. (Mississauga) 27, St. Michael's College School 0

Semi-finals:Clarkson S. S. 20, Central Technical 13 (OT)St. Michael's College School 20, Trinity College (Port Hope) 6

Quarter-finals:Trinity College 27, Markham D. H. S. 13Central Technical 6, Cedarbrae C. I. 1St. Michael's College 21, Richview C. I. 14 (OT)Clarkson S. S. 41, Waterdown D. H. S. (Waterdown) 35

1995 
Championship:St. Patrick’s 37, Mayfield S. S. (Caledon) 34 (Overtime)

Semi-finals:St. Patrick's 29, St. Michael's College 14Mayfield S. S. 29, Dunbarton H. S. (Pickering) 14

1994 
Championship:Northern S. S. 30, St. Patrick’s 21

Semi-finals:Northern S. S. 8, Pickering H. S. 7St. Patrick's 48, Lorne Park S. S. (Mississauga) 24

1993 
Championship:St. Patrick’s (Sarnia) 20, St. Michael's College 6

Semi-finals:St. Patrick's 29, West Hill C. I. 12St. Michael's College 14, Pickering H. S. 7

1992 
Championship:West Hill C. I. (Toronto) 24, Markham D. H. S. 6

Semi-finals:West Hill C. I. 19, Northern S. S. 8Markham D. H. S. 21, St. Thomas Aquinas S. S. (Brampton) 8

1991 
Championship:Richview C. I. (Toronto) 42, Central Technical 24

Semi-finals:Richview C. I. 36, Henry Street (Whitby) 19Central Technical 35; St. Michael's College 27

1990 
Championship:Northern S. S. 14, Markham D. H. S. 11

Semi-finals:Northern S. S. 29, Philip Pocock C. S. S. (Mississauga)  22Markham D. H. S. 22, Victoria Park C. I. 21

1989 
Championship:Sir John A. Macdonald C. I. (Toronto) 27, Michael Power/St. Joseph H.S. (Toronto) 8

Semi-finals:Sir John A. Macdonald C. I. 16, Crestwood S. S. (Peterborough) 7Michael Power/St. Joseph H.S. 37, King City S. S. (King City) 25

1988 
Championship:Central Technical 16, Pickering H. S. 10

Semi-finals:Central Technical 53, Etobicoke C.I. (Toronto) 20Pickering H. S. 9, Stephen Leacock C. I. 6

1987 
Championship:Central Technical 20, Monsignor Paul Dwyer C. H. S. (Oshawa) 14

Semi-finals:Central Technical 20;  Stephen Leacock C. I. (Toronto) 14Monsignor Paul Dwyer C. H. S. 33, A. Y. Jackson Secondary School (Toronto) 7

1986 
Championship:Victoria Park C. I. 21, Markham D. H. S. 12

Semi-finals:Victoria Park C. I. 27, Pickering H. S. (Ajax) 8Markham D. H. S. 15, Western Technical (Toronto) 12

1985 
Championship:Woburn C. I. 33, Victoria Park C. I. (Toronto) 12

Semi-finals:Woburn C. I. 29, Central Technical (Toronto) 13Victoria Park C. I. 22, Markham D. H. S. (Markham) 14

1984 
Championship:Georges Vanier S.S. (Toronto) 36, Northern S. S. (Toronto) 5

Semi-finals:Georges Vanier S.S. 25, Woburn C. I. 3Northern S. S. (bye)

1983 
Championship:Woburn C. I. 21, East York C. I. (Toronto) 14

Semi-finals: unknown

1982 
Championship:St. Michael's College (Toronto) 13, Woburn C. I. (Toronto) 0

Semi-finals: none played

MVPs 
 2012: Kaleb Scott QB, Huron Heights Secondary School, Newmarket
 2011: Chivon Gallagher SB, Donald A Wilson Secondary School, Whitby
 2010: Earl Anderson RB, Holy Trinity Catholic Secondary School (Courtice)
 2009: Tyler Pritty, QB, Markham District High School, Markham
 2008: Brendan Morgan, RB, St. Michael's College School, Toronto
 2007: Eddie Houghton, RB, St. Michael's College School, Toronto
 2006: Chris Rossetti, QB, St. Michael's College School, Toronto
 2005: Frank Aiello, RB, Pickering High School, Ajax
 2004: Charlie Houghton, RB, St. Michael's College School, Toronto
 2003: Matthew Morris, QB, Cedarbrae Collegiate Institute, Toronto
 2002: George Polyzois, RB, St. Michael's College School, Toronto
 2001: Tom Flaxman, RB, Richview Collegiate Institute, Toronto
 2000: Marc Champagnie, RB, Lorne Park Secondary School, Mississauga
 1999: Dwight McKenzie, RB, Central Technical School, Toronto
 1998: Mark Chiarcossi, RB, St. Michael's College School, Toronto
 1997: Jason Currie, QB/S, Nelson High School (Ontario), Burlington
 1996: Marvin Brereton, RB, Clarkson Secondary School, Mississauga
 1995: Terry Kleinsmith, QB, St. Patrick's Catholic High School, Sarnia
 1994: George Zegas, RB, Northern Secondary School (Toronto)
 1993: Terry Kleinsmith, QB, St. Patrick's Catholic High School, Sarnia
 1992: Alphonso Carter, DT, West Hill Collegiate Institute, Toronto
 1991: Paul Martin, QB, Richview Collegiate Institute, Toronto
 1990: Craig Adams, DB/L, Northern Secondary School (Toronto)
 1989: Carey Bowen, RB, Sir John A. Macdonald Collegiate Institute, Toronto
 1988: Patrick Burke, RB, Central Technical School, Toronto
 1987: Paul Ferreira, FB, Central Technical School, Toronto
 1986: Rob Wilson, TE, Victoria Park Collegiate Institute, Toronto
 1985: Stuart Harshaw, RB, Woburn Collegiate Institute, Toronto
 1984: Adam Karlsson, QB, Georges Vanier Secondary School, Toronto
 1983: Ken Noakes, LB, Woburn Collegiate Institute, Toronto
 1982: Chris Rick, RB, St. Michael's College School, Toronto
MVPs were chosen by David Grossman of the Toronto Star.

References

External links 
Ontario Federation of School Athletic Associations Football Championships
Durham Region Football Web Site Metro Bowl history
York Region Athletic Association
Toronto District Secondary School Athletic Association
Lake Ontario Secondary School Association

Canadian football in Toronto
High school football in Canada
Canadian football trophies and awards
Canadian football competitions